Niesslia is a genus of fungi in the family Niessliaceae. It was circumscribed by German mycologist Bernhard Auerswald in 1869, with Niesslia chaetomium assigned as the type species.

These organisms, which are barely visible to the naked eye, are found in decaying plant matter and are parasites of lichens, other fungi, or nematode eggs.  They belong to the ascomycetes and in their teleomorphic (sexual) stage they form distinctive dark brown shiny fruiting bodies with spines.  The fruiting body structures are a flask-shaped type called perithecia  where the spores escape through ostioles.  The asexual anamorphic stage was given the genus name Monocillium, now considered a synonym.

Species
, Species Fungorum accepts 98 species of Niesslia. Many species were formally described as new to science in 2019 after a phylogenetic framework for the genus was proposed based on molecular phylogenetic analysis.

Niesslia aemula 
Niesslia aeruginosa 
Niesslia agavacearum 
Niesslia albosubiculosa 
Niesslia allantoidea 
Niesslia ammophilae 
Niesslia anacardii 
Niesslia andicola 
Niesslia antarctica 
Niesslia arctiicola 
Niesslia artocarpi 
Niesslia aterrima 
Niesslia aurantiaca 
Niesslia bellotae 
Niesslia brevis 
Niesslia bulbillosa 
Niesslia catenata 
Niesslia cinctiostiolata 
Niesslia cladii 
Niesslia cladoniicola 
Niesslia clarkii 
Niesslia coenogonii 
Niesslia constricta 
Niesslia curvisetosa 
Niesslia dimorphospora 
Niesslia echinoides 
Niesslia elymi 
Niesslia erysiphoides 
Niesslia evae 
Niesslia exigua 
Niesslia exilis 
Niesslia exosporioides 
Niesslia fuegiana 
Niesslia fusiformis 
Niesslia gamsii 
Niesslia globospora 
Niesslia grisescens 
Niesslia hennebertii 
Niesslia heterophora 
Niesslia horridula 
Niesslia ilicifolia 
Niesslia indica 
Niesslia kapitiana 
Niesslia keissleri 
Niesslia kununguakii 
Niesslia lampracantha 
Niesslia lanea 
Niesslia lanuginosa 
Niesslia leucoula 
Niesslia ligustica 
Niesslia lobariae 
Niesslia loricata 
Niesslia luzulae 
Niesslia macrospora 
Niesslia microspora 
Niesslia minutispora 
Niesslia monocilliata 
Niesslia mucida 
Niesslia muelleri 
Niesslia nobilis 
Niesslia nolinae 
Niesslia nordinii 
Niesslia pacifica 
Niesslia palmicola 
Niesslia pandani 
Niesslia pandanicola 
Niesslia peltigerae 
Niesslia peltigericola 
Niesslia petrakii 
Niesslia philippinensis 
Niesslia physacantha 
Niesslia pseudocyphellariae 
Niesslia pulchriseta 
Niesslia puyae 
Niesslia rhizomorpharum 
Niesslia robusta 
Niesslia rollhansenii 
Niesslia sabalicola 
Niesslia schizospora 
Niesslia secedens 
Niesslia spegazziniana 
Niesslia sphaeropedunculata 
Niesslia stellenboschiana 
Niesslia stictarum 
Niesslia striatispora 
Niesslia subiculosa 
Niesslia subiculosella 
Niesslia sukauensis 
Niesslia sydowii 
Niesslia tatjanae 
Niesslia tenuis 
Niesslia tenuissima 
Niesslia tetrahedrospora 
Niesslia tiroliensis 
Niesslia typhae 
Niesslia vaginata 
Niesslia waitemataensis 
Niesslia xanthorrhoeae 
Niesslia yaganae

References

Sordariomycetes genera
Lichenicolous fungi
Niessliaceae
Taxa described in 1869